The Leopoldsteinersee is a mountain lake in Styria, in the east of Austria, about  northwest of the city of Eisenerz.  
The lake is named after the nearby Leopoldstein Castle.

Description 
The river Seebach feeds the lake, but it is mainly fed by underground springs.
The lake is surrounded by rugged mountains with mixed or coniferous forests. A  hiking trail circles the lake.
There is a local outfit that rents electric or rowing boats.

Legend 
The people near the lake have a legend that a merman was caught in the lake. To buy his freedom he showed his captors the iron deposits at Erzberg.

Gallery

References 

Citations

Sources

Lakes of Styria
Mountain lakes
LLeopoldsteinersee